Barbara Daly Baekeland (September 28, 1921 – November 17, 1972) was a wealthy American socialite who was murdered by her son, Antony "Tony" Baekeland. She was the ex-wife of Brooks Baekeland, who was the grandson of Leo Baekeland, inventor of Bakelite plastic.

She was murdered at her London home when her son Antony stabbed her with a kitchen knife, killing her almost instantly. Antony was found at the scene of the crime, and later confessed to and was charged with her murder.

Early life

Barbara Daly was born and raised in Cambridge, Massachusetts. In January 1933, when Barbara was aged 11, her father, Frank, committed suicide by carbon monoxide poisoning from the exhaust of his car in the garage. After the life insurance payment had been collected, Barbara and her mother moved to New York City, taking up residence in the Delmonico Hotel.

Career
As a young woman living in New York City, Barbara became a prominent socialite. She was recognized for her beauty, posing for painters and modeling with Vogue and Harper's Bazaar. Her social status and beauty resulted in frequent invitations to high society parties, allowing her to date various wealthy admirers. She also had mental health problems like her mother, and was a private patient of psychiatrist Foster Kennedy.

An invitation to Hollywood for a screen test with the actor Dana Andrews did not lead to film stardom, but did lead to a friendship with fellow aspiring actress Cornelia "Dickie" Baekeland. She introduced Barbara to her younger brother Brooks, a trainee pilot with the Royal Canadian Air Force.

Marriage
After Barbara falsely told Brooks Baekeland that she was pregnant, the couple quickly married in California. At the time of the marriage, Barbara listed her profession as painter, while Brooks listed his as writer.

After the marriage the couple set up home in a luxury apartment in the Upper East Side of New York, where they held extravagant dinner parties for their friends, who included Greta Garbo, Tennessee Williams, William Styron, and Yasmin Aga Khan. Over time, Barbara became well known to many for her unstable personality, rude outbursts, and bouts of severe depression. She also drank heavily, and both she and her husband participated in extramarital affairs.

Barbara gave birth to a son, Antony Baekeland, on August 28, 1946.

From the summer of 1954 onward, with Antony aged eight, the Baekeland family led a nomadic seasonal existence, maintaining their home in New York while being mainly based in Europe. Renting houses and villas in London, Paris, Zermatt, Cap d'Antibes, and many parts of Italy, Barbara and Brooks continued to live extravagantly, entertain guests, and have affairs. From 1960 onward, the family's main base was an apartment in Paris, where during one party, Brooks met an English diplomat's daughter who was 15 years his junior. After Brooks requested a divorce and Barbara subsequently tried to commit suicide, Brooks terminated the affair.

In 1967, at which time the family was based in both Switzerland and the Spanish resort of Cadaques, the 20-year-old Antony met Jake Cooper, a bisexual Australian man. Cooper introduced Antony to various hallucinogenic drugs, which they traveled to Morocco to obtain. Antony and Cooper also allegedly began an affair at this time, though this is denied by Cooper.  When Mrs. Baekeland was informed of this by her friend Barbara Curteis, she traveled by car to Spain to bring her son back to Switzerland. However, at the French border, Antony was found not to have his passport. After the ensuing fracas, both Antony and Barbara were arrested and placed in jail.

Divorce
Returning to Spain, Barbara accepted the extent of her son's relationship with Cooper, but preferred his developing relationship with a young Spanish girl, Sylvie. However, Sylvie then started an affair with Barbara's husband Brooks. After discovering the affair in February 1968, Barbara again tried to commit suicide. Brooks decided that he had had enough of Barbara's behavior and again, pursued a divorce. This led Barbara to severe depression and another suicide attempt, from which her friend Gloria Jones, wife of author James Jones, saved her.

Brooks married Sylvie and had one son. They later divorced and he married Susan Baekeland.

In 1969, Barbara met noted pop art curator Samuel Adams Green, with whom she started an affair. When later introduced to her son Antony, Green was very unimpressed by his artistic capabilities. After six weeks, Green broke off the relationship, although Barbara was still obsessed with him. She pursued Green relentlessly; when she returned to the United States that fall, she walked barefoot across Central Park in the snow wearing nothing but a Lynx fur coat to demand entry to his apartment.

Relationship with son
Barbara Baekeland had a complex and allegedly incestuous relationship with her son, Antony Baekeland, who was gay or bisexual. Baekeland attempted to "fix" her son by hiring prostitutes to have sex with him. After this failed, while the pair were living in Majorca in the summer of 1968 following Barbara and Brooks's divorce, Barbara was alleged to have raped her son.

During his young adulthood, Antony displayed increasingly regular signs of schizophrenia with paranoid tendencies, and his erratic behavior caused concern among family friends. He was eventually diagnosed with schizophrenia; however, his father initially refused to allow him to be treated by psychiatrists, a profession he believed to be "amoral".

Murder
In late July 1972, Antony tried to throw his mother under the traffic outside her penthouse on Cadogan Square in Chelsea, London. She was only saved by his physical weakness, and the intervention of her friend Susan Guinness. Although the Metropolitan Police arrested Antony for attempted murder, Barbara refused to press charges. Antony was subsequently admitted to The Priory private psychiatric hospital, but was released soon afterwards.

Antony then undertook sessions with a psychiatrist while living at home. The doctor became so concerned about Antony's condition that on October 30, he warned Barbara that he was capable of murder. Barbara dismissed the doctor's assertion.

Two weeks later, on November 17, 1972, Antony murdered his mother by stabbing her with a kitchen knife, killing her almost instantly. She was 51 years of age at the time, and Antony was 25. Police arrived and found Antony at the scene of the crime. He later confessed to, and was charged with, her murder.

Antony was institutionalized at Broadmoor Hospital until July 21, 1980, when, at the urging of a group of his friends, he was released.

Antony's death
Upon his release, Antony, now aged 33, flew directly to New York City to stay with his 87-year-old maternal grandmother, Nini Daly. Only six days after his release, on July 27, he attacked her with a kitchen knife, stabbing her eight times and breaking several bones. He was then arrested by the New York City Police Department, charged with attempted murder and sent to Rikers Island prison.

After eight months of assessment by the psychiatric team at Rikers Island, he was expecting to be released on bail at a court hearing on March 20, 1981. However, the case was adjourned by the judge due to a delay in the transfer of his medical records from the UK. Antony returned to his cell at 3:30 PM EST on March 20, 1981, and was found dead by suicide  30 minutes later, suffocated by a plastic bag.

Savage Grace

The 2007 film Savage Grace is based on the life of Barbara and Antony Baekeland, beginning with Antony's birth and following the family to the time of Antony's arrest for the murder of his mother. The movie–starring Julianne Moore, Stephen Dillane, Eddie Redmayne, Hugh Dancy, Elena Anaya, and Unax Ugalde–was based on the book of the same name.

After the film opened, Barbara Baekeland's former lover Samuel Adams Green wrote an article pointing out elements in the film, which were potentially misleading for those trying to read back to the reality inspiring it. He referred in particular to the ménage à trois scene, which depicted Barbara, Antony, and Sam Green in bed together having sex. Green  wrote:

Green then embarked on legal action against the film makers, which was still unresolved at the time of his death.

References

Citations
 Robins, Natalie, and Steven M.L. Aronson (1985). Savage Grace. New York: William Morrow & Co. .  
 Reissued in the U.S. as Savage Grace: the true story of fatal relations in a rich and famous American family (Simon & Schuster Touchstone, 2007). Sometimes issued in the U.K. as Savage Grace: the true story of a doomed family

External links
 "Books of the Times". Daniel Goleman. The New York Times. July 10, 1985. – contemporary review of Robins & Aronson, Savage Grace
 

American socialites
American expatriates in France
American expatriates in Italy
American expatriates in the United Kingdom
American people murdered abroad
American rapists
1972 in London
1970s murders in London
Matricides
People from Boston
People from the Upper East Side
People murdered in London
1922 births
1972 deaths
Incest
LGBT history in the United Kingdom
Female murder victims
1972 murders in the United Kingdom
1980 crimes in the United States
1982 in New York City
Deaths by stabbing in London